Ryeong Choi (born August 13, 1996) is an American soccer player who plays as a midfielder for Greenville Triumph SC in USL League One.

References

External links
 
 Profile at High Point Athletics

1996 births
Living people
American soccer players
Association football defenders
North Carolina Fusion U23 players
Greenville Triumph SC players
High Point Panthers men's soccer players
North Carolina FC U23 players
Soccer players from North Carolina
Sportspeople from High Point, North Carolina
USL League One players
USL League Two players